State Route 241 (SR 241) is a state highway in Orange County, California that is a toll road for its entire length. Its southern half from near Las Flores to near Irvine is the Foothill Transportation Corridor, while its northern half to SR 91 on the Anaheim–Yorba Linda border forms part of the Eastern Transportation Corridor system with SR 133 and SR 261. 

SR 241 is one of the highest elevated highways in Orange County and provides scenic views of both the Santa Ana Mountains and the cites below, passing through 12 different cities and regions along its length.

Legislatively, SR 241 is defined to run south to I-5 at San Onofre State Beach on the border with San Diego County. A plan to construct this portion was opposed due to environmental concerns. The county maintains the toll-free Los Patrones Parkway that extends the right-of-way south to Rancho Mission Viejo, but local officials do not intend to hand over control of the parkway to the state.

Route description

SR 241 runs along two named tollways: its southern half is the  Foothill Transportation Corridor, and its northern half is part of the Eastern Transportation Corridor.

The toll road begins at its interchange with Oso Parkway near Las Flores, while the right-of-way continues south as Los Patrones Parkway. SR 241 then heads northward through Rancho Santa Margarita and Trabuco Canyon near O'Neill Regional Park. It then passes through the eastern areas of Mission Viejo and Lake Forest before paralleling the rugged foothills in Irvine. It then runs along the easternmost edge of Irvine, with scenic views on either side, before meeting the eastern terminus of SR 133. SR 241 continues north as part of the Eastern Transportation Corridor following this interchange. SR 241 then meets SR 261 and Santiago Canyon Road (CR S18) near Irvine Lake before turning northeastward towards its northern terminus at SR 91 on the Anaheim–Yorba Linda border near the Santa Ana River.

SR 241 is part of the California Freeway and Expressway System, as well as the National Highway System, a network of highways that are considered essential to the country's economy, defense, and mobility by the Federal Highway Administration.

History

The toll road was constructed by the Transportation Corridor Agencies, also known as the TCA, and is owned by the state of California. Construction was financed with bonds, which are repaid with toll revenues. Taxpayers are not responsible for repaying any debt if toll revenues fall short.

Future

Proposed extension
SR 241 was planned to extend from its current southern terminus at Oso Parkway south to I-5 at the San Diego County border near San Onofre. This southern extension, known as Foothill-South, was intended to be the final piece in Orange County's planned  network of public toll roads. The extension would have provided an alternate route from SR 91 to I-5 for those traveling from Riverside County and through southeast Orange County, south to San Diego County.

Proponents of the project included a coalition of chambers of commerce, who argued it would provide greater access for communities such as Foothill Ranch, Rancho Santa Margarita, Las Flores, Coto de Caza, Wagon Wheel and Rancho Mission Viejo. Transportation Corridor Agencies (TCA) originally projected that traffic would increase 60 percent by 2025, and estimated that Foothill-South would alleviate traffic on I-5 by 2.6 to 8 percent. The proposed route was selected by a collaborative group that included the Federal Highway Administration, Environmental Protection Agency, Fish & Wildlife Service, the Army Corps of Engineers and Caltrans. Initially, the plan would have placed the final  of the roadway on Camp Pendleton Marine Base, as well as through a section of San Onofre State Beach, which is leased from the United States Marine Corps. The Marine Corps reserved the right to grant easements for rights of way when the lease with the California Department of Parks and Recreation was signed in 1971. Eventually, spokespeople from Camp Pendleton would deny permission to build the road on the base but approved the road's construction through the portion of the base that hosts the state park. The TCA Board of Directors, local elected officials who represent the areas adjacent to the toll road routes, certified the project's Environmental Impact Report in 2006.

Many conservationists, environmental groups, and some residents of San Clemente opposed the extension to San Onofre State Beach. Former California Attorney General Bill Lockyer filed two lawsuits in 2006, one on behalf of the Native American Heritage Commission. A third lawsuit was filed by a coalition of several groups, including Sierra Club, the Surfrider Foundation, Natural Resources Defense Council. It was later revealed that the TCA funded a study in support of removing the California gnatcatcher from the federal Endangered Species list, which would have made it easier to build the toll road extension.

On February 6, 2008, the California Coastal Commission voted 8-2 to reject the planned extension through San Onofre State Beach. The TCA appealed the Coastal Commission's decision to the U.S. Secretary of Commerce. On December 18, 2008, the Department of Commerce announced that it would uphold the California Coastal Commission's ruling that found the TCA's proposed extension inconsistent with the California Coastal Act. In a release issued by the Department of Commerce, the DOC noted that at least one reasonable alternative to the project existed, and that the project was not necessary in the interest of national security.

In November 2016, the TCA reached a legal settlement ending the 15-year dispute with the more than a dozen environmental organizations and the State of California. The settlement guaranteed that any roadway would avoid the Donna O'Neill Land Conservatory, the San Onofre State Beach Park, and other environmentally sensitive areas. The environmental organizations have agreed not to sue the TCA over other potential alignments that connect the 241 Toll Road to the I-5 freeway as long as the alignments do not enter the "environmental avoidance area."

Los Patrones Parkway
Rancho Mission Viejo, which has publicly condemned all the proposed alignments of the SR 241 extensions, helped to fund the construction of a  four-lane toll-free freeway known as Los Patrones Parkway. The road, maintained by Orange County, follows the exact alignment as the proposed Tesoro Extension of SR 241 between Oso Parkway and Cow Camp Road. Rancho Mission Viejo provided $85 million of the total estimated cost of $100 million to construct the road. Los Patrones Parkway also includes a new multi-purpose pathway on the west side of the highway between Oso Parkway and Chiquita Canyon Drive, two wildlife crossings under the road, wildlife fencing, and replanting of over 100 acres of vegetation. However, local environmental groups expressed concerns that the TCA may acquire Los Patrones Parkway in the future to extend SR 241 southward.

On August 10, 2018, the Orange County Public Works began construction on a $30 million project to turn a section of Oso Parkway into a bridge to allow a direct connection between SR 241 and Los Patrones Parkway. The new interchange was completed in mid-January 2021.

Los Patrones Parkway was built in two phases. Phase 1 of the road between Oso Parkway and Chiquita Canyon Drive opened on September 12, 2018. However, due to significant rainfall, the opening of Phase 2 of the road between Chiquita Canyon Drive and Cow Camp Road was delayed twice from the planned deadline of late-2018, and did not open until October 17, 2019.

Meanwhile, the TCA continued to explore alternative options to extend the toll road through San Juan Capistrano and San Clemente to I-5. After facing opposition, the TCA Board of Directors voted unanimously on March 12, 2020, to support a proposal to extend the county's toll-free Los Patrones Parkway south to Avenida La Pata near the San Clemente city limit.

In 2021, state senator Patricia Bates introduced Senate Bill 760 to remove the segment between Oso Parkway and I-5 segment from SR 241's legal definition, which would permanently kill any plan to convert Los Patrones Parkway to a toll road or any other plan to extend SR 241.

Tolls
SR 241 employs a barrier toll system, where drivers are charged flat-rate tolls based on what particular toll booths they pass through. Since May 13, 2014, the road has been using an all-electronic, open road tolling system. And on October 2, 2019, the license plate tolling program, under the brand name "ExpressAccount", was discontinued. Drivers may still pay using the FasTrak electronic toll collection system or via a one time payment online. Drivers must pay within 5 days after their trip on the toll road or they will be assessed a toll violation.

There are two mainline toll gantries: the Tomato Springs Mainline gantry just south of the SR 133 interchange, and the Windy Ridge Mainline gantry just south of the SR 91 interchange. , both gantries and the northbound exit and southbound entrance at Portola Parkway-North use a congestion pricing scheme based on the time of day for FasTrak users, while non-FasTrak drivers must pay the maximum toll ($4.40 at Windy Ridge, $4.20 at Tomato Springs, and $3.16 at Portola Parkway-North) regardless of the day and time. Tolls are also collected at a flat rate for all drivers at selected on-and off-ramps: the southbound exits and northbound entrances of Oso Pkwy ($2.59) and Antonio Parkway ($1.81); and the northbound exits and southbound entrances of Los Alisos Boulevard ($1.70), Portola Parkway-South ($1.81), and Alton Parkway ($2.69).

Exit list
Under the official exit list by Caltrans, mileage is measured from the unconstructed southern terminus at Interstate 5 near San Clemente.

Los Patrones Parkway exits
This exit list consists of the county-maintained Los Patrones Parkway that local officials do not intend to turn over to Caltrans or TCA for a possible extension of the SR 241 toll road. Thus, the state maintains no postmiles.

See also

References

External links

 – includes toll information on SR 241 and the other Toll Roads of Orange County
California @ AARoads.com — State Route 241
California Highways: SR 241
Caltrans: Route 241 highway conditions

Foothill-South
Foothill-South official project website
241 Toll Road extension proposal — Green OC at The Orange County Register
Save California’s Parks and Beaches — Save San Onfore
Relieve Traffic local site
Save Trestles site
Save Trestles-Wild Heritage Planners

241
State Route 241
241
241
Santa Ana Mountains